Audea luteoforma is a moth of the family Erebidae. It is found in Angola, the Democratic Republic of Congo, Kenya, Malawi, Rwanda, Tanzania, Zambia and Zimbabwe.

References

Moths described in 2005
Audea
Moths of Africa